Taldy-Bulak is a village in the Chüy District, Chüy Region, Kyrgyzstan. Its population was 758 in 2021. It is subordinated to Ibraimov rural community (ayyl aymagy) that also include villages Koshoy (center), Kara-Oy, Kyzyl-Asker, Lenin, and Lenin-Jol.

References

Populated places in Chüy Region